Harray (pronounced ) is a parish on Mainland, Orkney, Scotland. It has the unique distinction of being the only parish without a coastline, instead being landlocked and sitting next to a freshwater loch. Harray is surrounded by almost all the other parishes of the west mainland, extending southward from Birsay until it reaches the A965.

Harray is mostly flat and swampy, and has many mounds or 'howes' (from the Old Norse word  Haugr meaning mound or hill).  Excavations have revealed a burial cist in the largest mound as well as a Bronze Age building nearby.

References

Villages on Mainland, Orkney
Parishes of Orkney
Tumuli in Scotland